Gaetano Gabbiani was an Italian painter, active in 18th century Florence. the nephew of Antonio Domenico Gabbiani, studied under his uncle, and became a meritorious portrait painter in pastel. He died c. 1750.

References

1732 births
1750s deaths
People from Siena
18th-century Italian painters
Italian male painters
Painters from Tuscany
18th-century Italian male artists